Bastam is a city in Semnan Province, Iran.

Bastam may also refer to:
 Bastam Citadel, a Urartian fort
 Bastam, Kurdistan
 Bastam, Mazandaran
 Bastam, West Azerbaijan
 Bastam District, in Semnan Province